Taifu Comics is a French manga publisher established in 2004.

Titles
Akumetsu
Bond(z)
Challengers
Cobra
Crossroad
Cut
Densha Otoko
Girl Friends
Hanjuku-Joshi
Haru Natsu Aki Fuyu
Himitsu no Recipe
Karasu Tengu Kabuto
Koi wa Ina Mono Myōna Mono
Little Butterfly
Living For Tomorrow
Love Junkies
Shina Dark
Taimashin
The Tyrant Falls in Love
Wild Rock

See also
List of manga publishers

References

External links
  
 

Comic book publishing companies of France
French companies established in 2004
Manga distributors
Publishing companies established in 2004